Rosie Frankowski  (born July 30, 1991) is an American cross-country skier who competes internationally.
 
She represented the United States at the 2018 Winter Olympics.

Cross-country skiing results
All results are sourced from the International Ski Federation (FIS).

Olympic Games

World Championships

World Cup

Season standings

References

External links

1991 births
Living people
American female cross-country skiers
Olympic cross-country skiers of the United States
Cross-country skiers at the 2018 Winter Olympics
Place of birth missing (living people)
21st-century American women